Anna Louise Friel (born 12 July 1976) is an English actress. Born in Rochdale, Greater Manchester, she has been acting professionally since age 13. Friel achieved fame with her portrayal of Beth Jordache on the British soap opera Brookside (1993–1995), and came to international prominence when she played Charlotte "Chuck" Charles on ABC's Pushing Daisies (2007–2009). She is the recipient of several accolades, including an International Emmy Award, a Drama Desk Award, a National Television Award, an RTS Award, and an honorary degree, as well as nominations for BAFTA Award, Golden Globe Award, Satellite Award, Saturn Award, Genie Award and Czech Lion Award.

Friel made her film debut in The Land Girls (1998). She has since appeared in various features, such as A Midsummer Night's Dream, Rogue Trader (both 1999), Sunset Strip (2000), Me Without You (2001), Timeline (2003), Goal! (2005) and its sequel (2007), Bathory (2008), Land of the Lost (2009), London Boulevard, You Will Meet a Tall Dark Stranger (both 2010), Limitless (2011), The Look of Love (2013), The Cleanse, I.T. (both 2016), and Books of Blood (2020).

Outside film, Friel has starred in  numerous British and American television series, such as The Jury (2004), Odyssey (2015), The Girlfriend Experience (2017), Butterfly (2018), and Marcella (2016–2020). Her stage work includes Patrick Marber's Closer (Broadway, 1999), and West End productions of Breakfast at Tiffany's (2009) and Uncle Vanya (2012).

Early life
Anna Louise Friel was born on 12 July 1976 in Rochdale, Greater Manchester. Her mother Julie Bamford Friel (born 1952) is a special needs teacher. Her father, Desmond "Des" Friel (born 1951), was born in Belfast and raised in County Donegal, Ireland. He is a former French teacher and folk guitarist, who now owns a web design company. Her brother Michael is a physician, who in his youth did television advertising work for Hovis.

Friel attended Crompton House School (an Anglican school) and later Holy Cross College (a Roman Catholic college). She began her training as an actress at Oldham Theatre Workshop.

Career

1990s
Friel made her professional acting debut at age 13, playing the daughter of Michael Palin's character in the television miniseries G.B.H., which aired in the UK in 1991 and was nominated for several BAFTAs. This led to appearances on Coronation Street and Emmerdale. In 1992, she was cast as Beth Jordache on the Channel 4 soap opera Brookside. She played the role for two years, and was involved in some of the series' most famous plots, including the death of her on-screen father and a storyline featuring the first ever pre-nine-o'clock watershed lesbian kiss in British television history. The kiss went on to be broadcast around the world (including in 76 countries where homosexuality is illegal) when it was featured as part of the 2012 Summer Olympics opening ceremony. 

She later said, "For a very long time I was defined by that kiss. And I didn't want to be. I spent years turning down other lesbian roles because it felt like going back to Beth. [But it] did also make me want to take on parts that showed extreme sides of women". In 1995, Friel won a National Television Award in the category of Most Popular Actress for her work on Brookside.

Upon leaving the show, Friel was cast in an episode of Tales from the Crypt alongside Imelda Staunton, and appeared in Stephen Poliakoff's television film The Tribe (1998), which drew controversy for its inclusion of a ménage à trois sex scene. She then played leading roles in small-screen adaptations of Charles Dickens' Our Mutual Friend and Robert Louis Stevenson's St. Ives (both 1998), and co-starred in several British films, such as The Land Girls (1998), with Rachel Weisz; Rogue Trader (1999), with Ewan McGregor; and Mad Cows (1999), with Joanna Lumley. Next, she appeared as Hermia in the 1999 film version of Shakespeare's A Midsummer Night's Dream.

During this period, Friel made her Broadway debut in a production of Patrick Marber's Closer, which ran for 172 performances at the Music Box Theatre in New York. The show was applauded by critics, many of whom mentioned Friel as a highlight. Charles Isherwood of Variety wrote, "... it's the exquisitely lovely Friel who is the discovery here. Her Alice is both the nihilistic core of the play and its tender center, and the paradoxical mixture of toughness and fragility [she] brings to it are essential to the play's deepest truths. It'a a star-making performance". Later that year, Friel won the Drama Desk Award for Outstanding Featured Actress in a Play.

2000s
In 2001, Friel made her West End stage debut in an adaptation of Frank Wedekind's Lulu. Her film appearances during this time included lead roles in An Everlasting Piece (2000), directed by Barry Levinson and co-starring Billy Connolly; Sunset Strip (2000), opposite Jared Leto; Me Without You (2001), opposite Michelle Williams; and Richard Donner's big-budget fantasy-adventure film Timeline (2003), in which she played Gerard Butler's love interest. She also starred in the Canadian film The War Bride (2001), for which she received a Genie Award nomination for Best Actress.

Friel's next starring role was in the television film Watermelon (2003). She was then cast as Attorney Megan Delaney in The Jury, an American legal drama series that ran on Fox for a single season in 2004. Speaking about the experience, which was her first role on American television, she later reflected, "Everyone was saying, 'you will never believe how much hard work it is', and I was telling them not to worry because I'm used to it ... but my God were they right ... You run off the set from one scene and get changed and run back on. It is so fast and so very well organised but it is hard, hard bloody work".

In 2005, Friel played a Geordie nurse in the sports drama Goal!. The following year, she starred in the Canadian film Niagara Motel, and was awarded an Honorary Doctorate by the University of Bolton for contributions to the performing arts.

In 2007, Friel was cast as lead character Charlotte "Chuck" Charles in Pushing Daisies, an American comedy-drama television series created by Bryan Fuller, which aired on ABC from 2007 to 2009. The show received favourable reviews during its two-season run, and Friel's performance won her a Golden Globe nomination. However, it was revealed in November 2008 that Pushing Daisies had been cancelled due to declining ratings. Subsequently, Friel was offered six television roles during the following year's pilot season, but declined all of them in favour of focusing on her film career. Next, she starred as the title character in Bathory (2008), an historical drama directed by Juraj Jakubisko. Friel was nominated for a Czech Lion Award for her performance.

The following year, Friel co-starred with Will Ferrell in Land of the Lost, a big-budget adventure film based on the television series of the same name. Also that year, she returned to the West End as Holly Golightly in an adaptation of Truman Capote's Breakfast at Tiffany's, which played at the Theatre Royal Haymarket and gained attention for its addition of nudity. The production received mixed reviews, but Friel's portrayal of Holly Golightly (one of her "all time favourite heroines") was praised; Alice Jones of The Independent described her as "infectious", adding, "Gorgeously gamine and wrapped, like a treat from Tiffany's, in an array of ever more extravagantly bowed cocktail dresses, she's a bewitching stage presence, at once perilously provocative and child-like". Friel appeared nude in the production; an image of her nude scene, taken during a preview performance, ended up on the Internet, which prompted increased security at performances.

In November 2009, Friel received an RTS Award for her portrayal of a struggling single mother in the British drama series The Street.

2010s
In 2010, Friel appeared with Anthony Hopkins and Naomi Watts in the Woody Allen-directed comedy You Will Meet a Tall Dark Stranger. That same year, she starred opposite Colin Farrell and Keira Knightley in the crime drama London Boulevard, and co-starred with Bradley Cooper and Robert De Niro in the sci-fi thriller Limitless.

In 2011, Friel appeared as a fictionalised version of herself in an episode of the mockumentary series Come Fly with Me. That same year, she starred in Neverland on the SyFy channel (a prequel to J.M. Barrie's Peter Pan), and earned critical acclaim with her performance in the ITV drama Without You. Friel then returned to the West End to play the role of Yelena in an adaptation of Chekhov's Uncle Vanya, for which she received strong reviews. Next, she starred in the BBC series Public Enemies (2012); played Steve Coogan's wife in The Look of Love (2013), a biopic based on the life of Paul Raymond; and starred in the British film Having You (2013), opposite Andrew Buchan.

In September 2013, Friel was cast alongside Kyle Chandler in the Showtime pilot The Vatican, directed by Ridley Scott. It was announced later in the year that Showtime had decided not to proceed with a full series, as previously planned.

In 2015, Friel was cast in the lead role of Sergeant Odelle Ballard in American Odyssey, which ran for a single season on the NBC network. She also starred in the acclaimed Norwegian miniseries The Heavy Water War (UK title: The Saboteurs), a drama set during World War II. Next, she had leading roles in four films: Urban and the Shed Crew (2015), based on the non-fiction book of the same name; The Cleanse (2016), in which she co-starred with Anjelica Huston; I.T. (2016), a thriller directed by John Moore and starring Pierce Brosnan; and the Irish-Canadian crime drama Tomato Red (2017).

In 2017, Friel starred on the second season of The Girlfriend Experience, a drama series produced by Steven Soderbergh for the Starz network. Friel's portrayal of Erica Myles, a Republican engaged in relationships with two women, was described as "fantastic" and "outstanding". Referring to the series' intense work schedule and the explicit nature of its sex scenes, Friel said that the  role was her "most challenging job to date". That same year, she was nominated for a British Academy Television Award for her performance in the six-part BBC drama Broken.

Since 2016, Friel has played the title role in the British "Nordic" noir detective series Marcella. She won the International Emmy Award for Best Actress (2017) for her performance. Speaking about the series and her character, she said, "I nearly pulled out of it after I'd accepted it ... because I just thought, 'Oh God, how can I do this? There are so many amazing female detectives that have done it so well, I don't know what I can offer differently' ... so when it was received as well as it was, I thought maybe I had done something that is different and I've put my own ownership and my own stamp on it". In 2018, it was announced that the series would return for a third season.

In October 2018, Friel starred as the parent of a transgender child in Butterfly. Lucy Mangan of The Guardian described the miniseries as "important, truthful ... a wonderfully delicate drama that covers new ground carefully and features fully realised characters", while the New Statesman felt that Friel's portrayal of a mother  "racked by guilt" was "sterling". Friel said she and the show's creators felt a great responsibility to make it as realistic as possible; "We met all these wonderful families, who were saying, 'please tell our story and tell it properly'. I said, 'do you not feel represented?' And they said 'no'. People have so many comments and opinions, but they actually can be somewhat ill-informed".

2020s

Friel played Sharon Pici, a Kansas City detective, the lead role in The Box,  which premiered on Viaplay on 28 November 2021. In 2022, she starred in the country music drama series Monarch as Nicky Roman, a singer-songwriter trying to carry on her family's legacy while forging her own path in the industry. Friel performed all of the songs her character sings, which includes a mixture of covers and originals, herself.

Other work
Friel has featured in television and print advertising campaigns for brands such as Reebok, Virgin Atlantic, Mulberry, Three, Pantene, and Marks & Spencer. She has appeared as a cover girl for numerous magazines.

In 2010, she starred as a chess player in the music video for the Manic Street Preachers' single "(It's Not War) Just the End of Love", alongside actor Michael Sheen.

Friel works as an ambassador for the WWF wildlife charity.

Personal life
In 2001, Friel began a relationship with actor David Thewlis, after the pair met on a flight to Cannes. Later that year, Friel collapsed and was rushed to a hospital, needing emergency surgery and two blood transfusions for a ruptured ovarian cyst. It was discovered that she suffers from endometriosis and would have difficulty conceiving. Despite this, she later became pregnant and gave birth to a daughter, Gracie Ellen Mary Friel, on 9 July 2005 at Portland Hospital, London. Gracie was named after Gracie Fields, and her mother's grandmothers, Ellen and Mary.

In December 2010, Friel and Thewlis separated after almost ten years together.

Awards and nominations

Filmography

Film

Television

Voice work

References

External links
 
 

1976 births
20th-century English actresses
21st-century English actresses
Actresses from Greater Manchester
Drama Desk Award winners
English film actresses
English people of Irish descent
English soap opera actresses
English stage actresses
English television actresses
English Shakespearean actresses
Living people
People educated at Holy Cross College
People associated with the University of Bolton
People from Rochdale
Sun in a Net Awards winners
International Emmy Award for Best Actress winners
Theatre World Award winners